Lipoma HMGIC fusion partner is a protein that in humans is encoded by the LHFP gene.

This gene is a member of the lipoma HMGIC fusion partner (LHFP) gene family, which is a subset of the superfamily of tetraspan transmembrane protein encoding genes. This gene is fused to a high-mobility group gene in a translocation-associated lipoma. Mutations in another LHFP-like gene (LHFPL1, LHFPL2) result in deafness in humans and mice. Alternatively spliced transcript variants have been found; however, their full-length nature is not known.

References

Further reading

External links